Cobalt(III) oxide is the inorganic compound with the formula of Co2O3. Although only two oxides of cobalt are well characterized, CoO and Co3O4, procedures claiming to give Co2O3 have been described. Thus treatment of Co(II) salts such as cobalt(II) sulfate with an aqueous solution of sodium hypochlorite (also known as bleach) gives a black solid:

2CoSO4  +  4NaOH + NaOCl  →   Co2O3 + 2Na2SO4 + NaCl

Some formulations of the catalyst hopcalite contain "Co2O3".

Some studies have been unable to synthesize the compound, and report that it is theoretically unstable.

It is soluble in cold diluted sulfuric acid and produces Co2[SO4]3, which is blue in aqueous solution.

 Co2O3  +  3H2SO4  →  Co2[SO4]3  +  3H2O

Cobalt(III) ion is a strong oxidizer in acidic solution, its standard electrode potential is +1.84V in this situation.

See also
Cobalt Oxide Nanoparticles

References

Cobalt(III) compounds
Sesquioxides
Transition metal oxides